Schistocerca cohni is a species of bird grasshopper in the family Acrididae. It is found in Mexico.

References

Further reading

External links

 

Cyrtacanthacridinae
Orthoptera of North America
Insects of Mexico
Insects described in 2006